Two submarines of the United States Navy have been named Cuttlefish for the cuttlefish, a ten-armed marine mollusk similar to the squid.

 , was a B-class submarine that was renamed B-2.
 , was a Cachalot-class submarine that served in the opening days of World War II.

Sources
 

United States Navy ship names